Bruce Morrow (born 5 May 1936) is an Australian former footballer who played as a winger.

During his playing time in New South Wales, Morrow scored more than 368 goals in league and cup competitions. He represented Australia at the 1956 Summer Olympics. He scored twice in their second match, a 4–2 loss to India. 

Morrow was inducted into the Football Federation Australia Hall of Fame in 2005, alongside Robbie Slater and Craig Johnston.

References

Living people
1936 births
Australian soccer players
Association football wingers
Australia international soccer players
Footballers at the 1956 Summer Olympics
Olympic soccer players of Australia